Peter Colin Taylor is a Liberal Democrat politician. He is the second directly elected mayor of Watford in the United Kingdom. He was elected in the 2018 election, succeeding Dorothy Thornhill. Before becoming Elected Mayor of Watford, he was a teacher and a local Oxhey ward councillor.

Early life and career
Peter Taylor was raised in Sheffield and attended Notre Dame High School. He then attended the University of Edinburgh before moving to Watford to work as a teacher. He continued to work in the education sector as Assistant Director to the Catholic Education Service, representing over 2000 Catholic schools in England and Wales.

Councillor
Peter Taylor was elected as a Liberal Democrat councillor in Oxhey Ward in 2012. He served in Dorothy Thornhill's Cabinet as Deputy Mayor and Cabinet Member for Client Services, overseeing the town's parks, leisure centres, bin collections and theatres.

Mayor
Peter Taylor was elected Mayor of Watford on 4 May 2018, succeeding incumbent Mayor of Watford Dorothy Thornhill with an increased first preference vote share of 48.7%.

Peter Taylor made improving the town's transport infrastructure and increasing support for local rough sleepers some of his key priorities. In particular, he is working to introduce a new Cycle Hire Scheme to Watford as well as a new On Demand Bus Service. He is looking for a replacement to the previous Metropolitan Line Extension since Transport for London were unable to complete the scheme.

Peter Taylor uses various social media platforms and hosts regular Facebook Live Q and A sessions with local residents to quiz him about his plans for the town, which often get ignored, in favor of building flats in every available space, as well as finding ways to waste the taxpayers money.

Personal life
Peter Taylor lives in Oxhey with his wife and three children.

References

Living people
Mayors of places in Hertfordshire
Year of birth missing (living people)
Liberal Democrat (UK) elected mayors